Alice Grace Cobb (born 31 July 1995) is a British racing cyclist, who most recently rode for UCI Women's Continental Team . She rode in the women's road race event at the 2018 UCI Road World Championships.

References

External links

1995 births
Living people
British female cyclists
Place of birth missing (living people)
21st-century British women